The International Journal of Motorcycle Studies (IJMS) is the first peer-reviewed journal dedicated to the study and discussion of motorcycling culture. The journal considers motorcycling culture in all its forms — from the experience of riding and racing to the history of the machine, the riders and design to the images of motorcycling and motorcyclists in film, advertising and literature.

Notes

Publications established in 2005
English-language journals
Cultural journals
Biannual journals
Motorcycling subculture